Negativicoccus is a Gram-negative and anaerobic genus of bacteria from the family of Veillonellaceae.

References

Further reading 
 
 
 

 

Negativicutes
Bacteria genera